The UK Albums Chart is one of many music charts compiled by the Official Charts Company that calculates the best-selling albums of the week in the United Kingdom. Before 2004, the chart was only based on the sales of physical albums. This list shows albums that peaked in the Top 10 of the UK Albums Chart during 1969, as well as albums which peaked in 1968 and 1970 but were in the top 10 in 1969. The entry date is when the album appeared in the top ten for the first time (week ending, as published by the Official Charts Company, which is six days after the chart is announced).

The first new number-one album of the year was by The Best of The Seekers by The Seekers. Overall, twelve different albums peaked at number one in 1969, with The Beatles (2) having the most albums hit that position.

Top-ten albums
Key

Notes

 Fresh Cream originally charted at number 39 upon its release in 1966 and entered the top 10 in 1967, peaking at number 6. It re-entered the top 10 at number 7 on 15 February 1969 (week ending) for one week.
 Disraeli Gears originally peaked at number 5 upon its release in 1967. It re-entered the top 10 at number 7 on 22 February 1969 (week ending).

See also
1969 in British music
List of number-one albums from the 1960s (UK)

References
General

Specific

External links
1969 album chart archive at the Official Charts Company (click on relevant week)

United Kingdom top 10 albums
Top 10 albums
1969